Luciano Moggi ( born 10 July 1937) is a former Italian association football administrator. He was a club executive for Roma, Lazio, Torino, Napoli, and Juventus, leading them to win six leagues (five with Juventus and one with Naples), three Coppa Italia (with Roma, Torino, and Juventus), five Supercoppa Italiana (four with Juventus and one with Napoli), one UEFA Champions League, one Intercontinental Cup, one UEFA Super Cup, and one Intertoto Cup (all with Juventus), as well as winning one UEFA Cup with Napoli. He has since become a freelance journalist and commentator.

In May 2006, Moggi was involved in the sports scandal that became known as Calciopoli, which remains a much debated and controversial topic due to the one-sided focus on Juventus and Moggi, an issue that was cited in the Naples sentence about the criminal trial. The related Calciopoli trials in Naples, which revealed the implications of many other clubs who could not be put on trial due to the statute of limitations and were not weighted in the Moggi sentences, absolved him of some related offences and reached the appeal sentence in December 2013 with a sentence of 2 years and 4 months in prison. His remaining charges related to Calciopoli were cancelled without a new trial due to the statute of limitations by Italy's Supreme Court of Cassation in March 2015. In March 2020, Moggi appealed to the European Court of Human Rights for the conduct of the trials.

Biography 
Moggi was born into a modest family in Monticiano, in the province of Siena, at the time Kingdom of Italy, on 10 July 1937. He had a passion for football from an early age, playing for forty days in Akragas in the 1963–64 Serie C season. He left school at the age of 13. After middle school, he worked at the Ferrovie dello Stato Italiane, settling in Civitavecchia and playing as a stopper in teams of lower categories. In the late 1960s, dissatisfied with his work and tired of playing football without income, Moggi envisioned a future as a talent scout, particularly in minor football. His son, Alessandro Moggi, works as an agent for several football players and managers. He is head of GEA World, a consortium of football agents and managers, which were ranked the first by volume from 2002 to 2006.

Career 
Moggi worked as a railway station caretaker until the early 1970s, when he met Italo Allodi, then Juventus' managing director, who appointed him to minor roles at the club. Before being called as chief managing director by Juventus in 1994, he worked for and collaborated with several teams, such as Roma, Lazio, Torino, and Napoli, where he won several league, domestic, and confederal titles.

Early years at Juventus and Roma 

After entering senior football in the 1970s for Juventus under general manager Allodi, Moggi organized a network of scouts looking for young talent in suburban fields. Among his fotballers are the sixteen year old Paolo Rossi in 1972, Claudio Gentile in 1973, and Gaetano Scirea in 1974. A few years later, Moggi took on a more important role, and he also established contacts with the other teams to start negotiations until he was forced to change companies due to the break with then-Juventus president Giampiero Boniperti.

Moggi's next job was at Roma of the new president Gaetano Anzalone. Thanks to the help of some journalists, it was Moggi who came forward and got to know Anzalone, who decided on his job as transfer market consultant in 1977. During his period at Roma, which won the 1979–80 Coppa Italia, Moggi acquired Roberto Pruzzo, who was blown right to Boniperti's Juventus. His departure from Roma occurred a few days after Dino Viola, the new president, learned that, on the eve of the match against Ascoli, Moggi had been having dinner with Claudio Pieri, the match referee. It was 25 November 1979 and the tenth matchday of the 1979–80 Serie A that was being played; Roma won the match 1–0 and the president of Ascoli, Costantino Rozzi, was upset about a refeering that, in his view, was in favour of Roma. In the locker room, Rozzi met Viola, to whom he said his criticism of Moggi, seen in a restaurant in the company of the referee and the two linesmen. Moggi described it as a casual event. Viola used the episode as a pretest to release Moggi, telling him he wanted a sporting director who lived in Rome, even though Moggi lived in the Rome metropolitan area of Civitavecchia.

Lazio, Torino, Napoli, Roma, and Juventus 

After the 1980 Italian football betting scandal, which came to be known as Totonero and in which he was not involved, Moggi was hired as general manager by Lazio to relaunch it. After two years, he resigned with the club still in Serie B. In 1982, he moved at Torino of president Sergio Rossi and managing director Luciano Nizzola. He suffered the protests of the fans due to the underwhelming market hits completed, such as the Argentine Patricio Hernández, or missed ones, such as the Yugoslav Safet Sušić. He remained at Torino for five years with mixed results. On 29 May 1987, he resigned from his position.

On 22 June 1987, Moggi moved at Napoli of Corrado Ferlaino and Diego Armando Maradona immediately after the victory of their first scudetto, succeeding Allodi. Napoli won the 1989 UEFA Cup final, the 1989–90 Serie A, and the 1990 Supercoppa Italiana. In March 1991, Moggi resigned due to incompatibility with Ferlaino. He then returned at Torino under president Gian Mauro Borsano, and the club reached the 1992 UEFA Cup final, which was lost due to the away goals rule, and won the 1993 Coppa Italia final due to the same rule. In 1994, he was investigated together with his collaborator Luigi Pavarese for sporting offenses and aiding and abetting prostitution for referees during the 1991–92 UEFA Cup matches. Borsano and the accountant Giovanni Matta testified that it was Moggi who personally took care of the hospitality of the referees and linesmen, and of providing them with prostitutes for the home games, while the services were paid for by Torino through black funds. The sentence was one of acquittal because Pavarese assumed all the responsibilities, while on the sporting side the fraud could not exist as sporting fraud did not apply to UEFA matches, and UEFA quickly closed its investigation.

Once he left Torino, Moggi returned at Franco Sensi's Roma. In 1994, he moved at Juventus under the managing director Antonio Giraudo and where he would be described by Gianni Agnelli as "the king's groom, who must know all horse thieves". The twelve years with Juventus were the most successful of his entire management career and placed him among the most important football managers at national and international level. Juventus won five leagues (plus one revoked and one left unassigned), one UEFA Champions League, one Intercontinental Cup, one UEFA Super Cup,  one Intertoto Cup, one Coppa Italia, and four Supercoppa Italiana. He also reached three Champions League finals, one UEFA Cup final, and two other finals of Coppa Italia.

Moggi remained at Juventus until May 2006 when he resigned, saying: "They killed my soul." He was linked to a judicial investigation in the sports field known as Calciopoli. Some telephone tapping of an investigation filed by the court of Turin were published in some newspapers, the folders of which had been sent to Franco Carraro, then president of the Italian Football Federation (FIGC) and himself involved in the scandal but came out unscattered not without controversy, in which some managers inquired with the referee designator Pierluigi Pairetto, then-referee delegate for UEFA, on the names of some referees who had to be drawn to referee the matches of the next Champions League. A scandal then broke out, which led to the resignation of Moggi and the other two managers, for an investigation that theorized the crime of criminal association aimed at sports fraud. According to the allegations, Moggi had singular relationships with some people who gravitated around Italian sports journalism, with the aim of putting the work of referees and clubs in a good or bad light. Turin's public prosecution office had earlier rejected the charges by the prosecution.

Calciopoli 
In May 2006, Moggi was linked as the central figure in Calciopoli, a vast referee lobbying scandal spanning the professional top two Italian football leagues. Daily newspaper la Repubblica published the contents of several wiretappings in which Moggi, along with the country's former referee nominator Pierluigi Pairetto, was said to assign referees to specific matches, including many in which Juventus was not a participant. Moggi received a five-year ban from football and a recommendation to the FIGC president that he be banned for life from membership of the FIGC at any level. This was controversial because he and Giraudo (both from Juventus) were the sole executives to be banned for life, which came a few months before their five-year ban expired. As summarized by Carlo Garganese for Goal.com, "[the FIGC sentence] stated perfectly clearly  that no Article 6 violations (match-fixing/attempted match-fixing breaks the sixth article of the sporting code) were found within the intercepted calls and the season was fair and legitimate, but that the ex-Juventus directors nonetheless demonstrated they could potentially benefit from their exclusive relationship with referee designators Gianluigi Pairetto and Paolo Bergamo. There were, however, no requests for specific referees, no demands for favours and no conversations between Juventus directors and referees themselves." Juventus had been absolved in the ordinary justice proceedings, and the courts ruled that Moggi acted in his self-interest to help Lazio and Fiorentina, which is why Juventus was absolved of wrongdoings and was not liable by other clubs; Moggi said that he did not care about Fiorentina and Lazio but that Carraro did, citing his own wiretaps in which Carraro asked to help them.

As early as 2010, when many other clubs were implicated and Inter Milan, Livorno, and Milan liable of direct Article 6 violations in the 2011 Palazzi Report, Juventus considered challenging the stripping of their scudetto from 2006 and the non-assignment of the 2005 title, dependent on the results of Calciopoli trials connected to the 2006 scandal. On 8 November 2011, Naples court issued the first conclusion of the criminal case against Moggi and the other football personalities involved, sentencing him to jail for five years and four months for criminal association. In December 2013, Moggi's sentence was reduced to two years and four months for being found guilty of conspiring to commit a crime; the earlier charge of sporting fraud was dismissed, owing to the statute of limitations. On 23 March 2015, in its final resolution, Italy's Supreme Court of Cassation ruled that Moggi was acquitted of "some individual charges for sporting fraud, but not from being the 'promoter' of the 'criminal conspiracy' that culminated in Calciopoli." Nevertheless, the remaining charges of Moggi were cancelled without a new trial due to the statute of limitations.

When Moggi's conviction in criminal court in connection with the scandal was partially written off by the Supreme Court, Juventus sued the FIGC for €443 million for damages caused by their 2006 relegation. Then-FIGC president Carlo Tavecchio offered to discuss reinstatement of the lost scudetti in exchange for Juventus dropping the lawsuit. On 9 September 2015, the Supreme Court released a 150-page document that explained its final ruling of the case, based on the controversial 2006 sporting sentence, which did not take in consideration the other clubs involved because they could not be put on trial due to the statute of limitations, and it would be necessary to request and open a revocation of judgment pursuant to Article 39 of the Code of Sports Justice. Despite his remaining charges being cancelled without a new trial due to the statute of limitations, the court confirmed that Moggi was actively involved in the sporting fraud, which was intended to favour Juventus and increase his own personal benefits according to La Gazzetta dello Sport. As did the Naples court in 2012, the court commented that the developments and behavior of other clubs and executives were not investigated in depth. In 2016, the TAR tribunal rejected the request of compensation promoted by Juventus. On 15 March 2017, Moggi's lifetime ban was definitively confirmed on final appeal.

Moggi continues to make observations on the Serie A on Italy's newspapers, as well as sports and local television channels, such as Sportitalia and Telecapri Sport. Since 2011, he collaborates with Radio Manà Manà. In March 2020, having exhausted appeals in Italy's courts, Moggi appealed to the European Court of Human Rights for the conduct of the trials, including the lack of time given to the defence in the 2006 sporting trial, among other issues; Giraudo's was accepted in September 2021.

Proceedings 
Calciopoli trials were much debated and controversial since their beginning in 2006. While supporters of the prosecution cite the sentences as evidence, there remains controversy and unclear aspects. Several observers and commentators feel that Moggi was made a scapegoat, cited inconsistencies in the sentences, such as Juventus being absolved and the league not being fixed but the club was relegated to Serie B, including the lack of investigation into other clubs and executives, and argue that only Moggi and Juventus paid, and that it was disproportionate, since unlike other clubs and executives, who could not be put on trial due to the statute of limitations, they were never charged of Article 6 violations (Inter Milan, Livorno, and A.C. Milan were the clubs charged of Article 6 violations by the prosecutor Stefano Palazzi in 2011), the one about illicits that is ground for relegation. No judge returned evidence to affirm that the 2004–05 Serie A was fixed as charged by the prosecution; the chief prosecutor had to change the charge to that of anticipated crime for something that was not committed, and Moggi's charge, as written in the Naples sentence, which did not take in consideration the thousands of thousands wiretaps that were publicly released by Moggi's legal team in 2010 and were available to the investigators back in 2006 but were not used, was not that he fixed matches or leagues but that his behavior was close enough to "the limit of the existence of the crime of attempt", hence the conviction.

Some observers alleged that Calciopoli and its aftermath were also a dispute within Juventus and between the club's owners, who wanted to get rid of Moggi, Giraudo, and Roberto Bettega, whose shares in the club increased. Whatever their intentions, it is argued they condemned Juventus, firstly when lawyer Carlo Zaccone asked for relegation and point-deduction, refn|In later years, Zaccone clarified he made that statement because Juventus were the only club risking more than one-division relegation (Serie C), and he meant for Juventus (the sole club to be ultimately demoted) to have equal treatment with the other clubs; and secondly when Luca Cordero di Montezemolo retired the club's appeal to the Regional Administrative Court (TAR) of Lazio, for which then FIFA president Sepp Blatter and then CONI president Gianni Petrucci thanked John Elkann and Montezemolo, and that could have reduced Moggi's charges and cleared the club's name and avoid relegation, after FIFA threatened to suspend the FIGC and barring all Italian clubs from international play. This amounted, as recounted by Corriere della Sera journalist Mario Sconcerti, to "a sort of public plea bargain" and guilty admission. Calciopoli judge Piero Sandulli stated that the GEA World ruling dismantled the prosecution, and commented: "We punished the violation of internal rules in 2006. Basically, our sentence highlighted above all bad habits, not classic illicit acts. It had to be made clear that what was in the wiretapping is not to be done. It was an ethical condemnation. The criminal trial evaluates other things."

Sports justice 
In the sports sentence, the Federal Appeal Commission (CAF), a FIGC judicial court, stated that Juventus was not responsible for Fiorentina avoiding relegation, and that Moggi and Giraudo operated independently of Juventus and its owners. In addition, the court ruled that there was no evidence of match fixing or a Moggi system, as was reported by La Gazzetta dello Sport. Finally, referee selections were done in accordance with the rules of the FIGC, phone calls made by Moggi to referee designator Paolo Bergamo did not constitute in itself a sporting illicit, and there was no organization of targeted yellow cards. Nonetheless, the sentence stated that "though Moggi didn't exercise his ability to condition matches, he still possessed the ability", and even though there were no Article 6 violations against Juventus, it introduced the much-disputed illecito associativo ("associative illicit") violation, which resulted in the club's relegation; the given motivation was that "Juventus' advantage was evidenced by their position in the standings at the end of the season."

In July 2006, the FIGC's Court of Justice confirmed a five-year ban for Moggi, with a proposal to ban him for life. In response to the sentence, he said: "I am not bitter for myself, but for the teams implicated and for their supporters. No match was fixed, no referees were favored. It is why Juventus and the other clubs, but especially the fans, are frustrated by this sentence." In 2010, the FIGC banned Moggi for life. In response, he said: "I don't know anything, I don't know what it means, they should be ashamed after what came out. I speak for myself, Giraudo, for those who suffer from this situation, they should expel Carraro." Moggi then went on to say: "I have never said that everyone is guilty and therefore there is no one to blame. There is a practice, you have to ban Carraro when he says in wiretaps that you have to save Fiorentina and Lazio." He commented: "I hope that in a short time the state authorities will decide to intervene, perhaps with an institutional control body, on the federal atrocities that have been committed and are continuing to be committed against me." He wondered "why the sports judges, having to have condemned me on the basis of a handful of interceptions, despite knowing that there were many others, did not continue to investigate as was their duty, and only in these days have realized their faults and their omissions, which surprisingly claim to conclude with the statute of limitations for Moratti and company, and a ban for the undersigned, as they would never have dared to doeven in the Banana Republic." On 9 July 2011, the Federal Court confirmed his ban. In 2012, CONI confirmed Moggi's lifetime ban. The TAR of Lazio rejected the request for suspension of the provision of the High Court of Sports Justice. In 2016, the TAR rejected the appeal, definitively confirming the foreclosure from any position in the context of Italian sport. On 15 March 2017, Italy's Council of State judged inadmissible the appeal filed by Moggi against the lifetime ban due to lack of jurisdiction of the state judge.

Criminal justice

GEA World 
Moggi was charged of criminal association aimed at unlawful competition through threats and private violence as part of the investigation into the GEA World company. According to the prosecution, he and his son, Alessandro Moggi, as well as Franco Zavaglia, were the promoters of the system of power that would have led GEA to exercise a dominant function in the world of football. The indictment stated that the three would have created GEA to "acquire the largest number of sports attorneys, through them, obtain a contractual power capable of decisively affecting the football market, to influence the management of players and consequently that of various teams in the football league." In 2009, the X section of the Rome Court sentenced Moggi to 1 year and 6 months' imprisonment for private violence against the football players Manuele Blasi, who was induced to leave his sports manager, Stefano Antonelli, to go to GEA, and Nicola Amoruso, on similar grounds.

In the appeal process, both he and his son were acquitted, together with all the other members of GEA, of the charge of criminal conspiracy aimed at unlawful competition, as the request for a sentence of 4 years and 8 months by the attorney general Alberto Mussel was rejected. The sentence of the appeal trial of 25 March 2011 reduced the sentence to one year's imprisonment due to the statute of limitations of the facts relating to Amoruso; it also sentenced Moggi to pay damages against the prosecutor Stefano Antonelli and the FIGC, and confirmed the acquittal for the charge of criminal association. The one-year sentence would not have been served as it was covered by the 2006 pardon. On 15 January 2014, the trial ended with the annulment "for incorrect application of the law" without a new trial due to the statute of limitations for the one-year sentence for private violence established in the second instance and the confirmation of the acquittal verdict issued in the two previous instances with regard to the accusation of criminal conspiracy aimed at unlawful competition.

Naples Court of Appeal and Supreme Court of Cassation 
In October 2008, chief prosecutor Giuseppe Narducci was quoted in court as saying: "Like it or not, no other calls exist between the designators and other directors." During the criminal trials in Naples, the legal team of Moggi released a number of wiretaps showing that Inter Milan, Milan, and many other Italian clubs and executives not previously investigated in 2006 were involved in referee lobbying. Moggi's lawyer Maurilio Prioreschi asked the court to take in consideration that between 2006 (the year of the first sentences) and 2011 (the year of the sentence on Moggi's lifetime ban) numerous hearings were held during the criminal trial in Naples, from which wiretaps involving other club executives that, according to Moggi's legal defence, would drop the basic assumption of the 2006 sporting conviction, namely that relating to the conditioning of the referees thanks to the preferential treatment by the referee designators towards Moggi and Juventus, which in turn led to the sporting offence. Many of those wiretaps formed the body of Palazzi's report, with which the FIGC's chief prosecutor intended to refer many executives and clubs for violations of the Code of Sports Justice, a circumstance that was prevented only by the statute of limitations. The court's Disciplinary Commission purposely ignored this defensive argument, and arguing that it was a reassessment of the facts not permitted at that time, no importance was given to the conduct of those other clubs and executives that had just emerged during the criminal trial. According to the FIGC's Court of Justice, as explained in its judgment of appeal in regards to the term attualizzare ("actualize"), the court was there not to expand the evidence on which the first judgment was based but rather to ascertain whether at that time those established facts were still serious enough to justify a lifetime ban; it concluded that this ruling must be expressed exclusively "on the basis of the sentences rendered" against Moggi, and cannot take into consideration any comparative judgment with conducts possibly attributable to other subjects of the FIGC law. The court stated that to have a reassessment of the facts of Calciopoli, it would be necessary to request and open a revocation of judgment pursuant to Article 39 of the Code of Sports Justice.

On 8 November 2011, Moggi was sentenced in the first instance by the Naples Court to 5 years and 4 months in prison (in addition to the five-year ban and lifetime ban) for promoting the criminal conspiracy On 17 December 2013, in the appeal process, the sentence was reduced to 2 years and 4 months. On 24 March 2015, the Supreme Court of Cassation annulled the verdict of conviction in the second instance without a new trial, as the crime of criminal conspiracy was extinguished by the statute of limitations, and of two charges of sports fraud due to the non-existence of the crime, as well as the rejection of the appeal for some charges of sports fraud, which were extinguished by the statute of limitations in 2012.

Moggi's reactions 
Moggi always declared himself innocent, and in his appeals to the European Court of Human Rights stated that "if they give me a pardon, I renounce it. Pardon is for those who are guilty, I'm not guilty [of the 'criminal association' charge], I didn't do anything [criminal]. They weren't angry at me, they were angry at Juventus because it won too much." About his actions, Moggi stated that they were criticizable, and he was wrong from an ethical standpoint but did not commit any illicit; he said that "[t]he sports court, at the end of the trial, ruled as follows: 'Regular championship, no match altered.' Therefore Juventus [is] exempt from crimes referred to in Art. 6. The final ruling of the ordinary justice instead spoke of 'early consummation' crimes, which are nothing more than the fruit of hypotheses and inferences of that prosecutor who in the courtroom had asserted 'there were no other phone calls, if not those of the suspects in the trial', while the [Italian Football] Federation Prosecutor asserted that 'Inter Milan was the club that risked most of all for the illegal behavior of its President Facchetti." About the Swiss sim cards, Moggi stated that he used them to circumvent "those [such as Inter Milan and Inter Milan's Telecom] who intercepted us", with reference to transfer operations. He commented: "We had bought Stanković and we also had the contract ready to be presented to the [Italian Football] Federation. After two months the player and his agent disappeared, we found them at Inter Milan." About the wiretaps, Moggi said that he never intruded on the designation of referees, and spoke of incomplete wiretaps for the prosecution. Moggi also reiterated that "[t]hey accused me of going to the referees' locker room but that's not true; others did. Paparesta's kidnapping never happened, it was just a joke."

Moggi maintained that political, economic, and sporting power is in Milan and Rome, not in Turin, a criminal association really existed but it was not his, and was in Milan and Rome, headed by then-FIGC president Franco Carraro, and that then-Milan's vice-president Adriano Galliani held the most power and was in conflict of interest, as he was also Lega Calcio president. In 2014, Andrea Agnelli, who became president of Juventus in 2010, stated: "Moggi represents a beautiful and important part of our history. We are the country of Catholicism and forgiveness. We can also forgive people, can't we?" Moggi responded: "Nice words. I thank Andrea Agnelli, but I don't need forgiveness. If anything, I deserve praise for [the 16 trophies won on the pitch for the club]. ... There were twenty clubs and they behaved in the same way but only Juve paid because it bothered." In response to the final verdict in 2015, which came after six hours of delibaration, Moggi said: "We mucked about for nine years and that's not nice because this abnormal trial has come to nothing. Just a lot of expense. In nine years, it has been established that the championship was by the book, the draws were by the book and there were no conversations about designations." He said that it merely let the courts off the hook, not him, and vowed to turn to the European courts in hopes to have his ban from football world lifted.

About the allegations of alterated leagues, Moggi responded: "There's only one reality. When I was at Juve, we won two consecutive league titles at most. From 2000 to 2004, they were won by Lazio, Milan, and Roma. Lazio won because of the flood at the stadium with a 74-minute suspension of the [Perugia–Juventus] match. This was something that never happened before. Roma also won thanks to the Nakata case. They made us lose championships for irregular things, at that moment Juve was the weak side." In regards to the controversial 2000 Perugia–Juventus match, to which he regretted not having the team retire and go home, Moggi criticized the match's referee Pierluigi Collina. Collina was particularly liked before and during Calciopoli by Milan's and Rome's clubs, had the same Milan's sponsor, and secretly met with Galliani, who selected him as referee designator due to being Lega Calcio president, at Milan's Leonardo Meani's restaurant. While he would be unaffected by Calciopoli, he was found to be close to Milan, of which he shared the same sponsor (Opel) without the consent of the FIGC's then-referee association president Tullio Lanese, leading to his resignement and retirement, after which he said he was a Lazio supporter. Observers agree that rules were violated. Moggi said: "I was accused of being the great manipulator in football, so explain to me how I managed to lose a championship by playing the decisive match in a pool. The truth is that Juve should have left, instead we remained there at the mercy of those who decided and when we took the field we were no longer there. [Collina] certainly spoke to someone on the phone: who it was, we will never know. I'm just saying that by regulation the suspension can't last more than 45 minutes: instead Collina waited almost double." In later years, he further commented: "As it happens, it then comes out of the wiretaps that Collina goes to talk to Galliani and says: 'I will come at midnight, I enter the back door so they don't see me.' If Milan couldn't win, they didn't want Juventus to win either." Carlo Ancelotti, Juventus coach from 1999 to 2001 and Milan coach at the time of Calciopoli, testified in 2010 that he found the Perugia match to be "an odd fact".

About Silvio Berlusconi, Moggi said: "I thanked him and I thank him for his esteem for me, maybe I reserve him a criticism for what he didn't do to the Calciopoli explosion: he knew that innocent people would be penalized, obviously for him too it was a priority to demolish Juventus' domain." Moggi also said that Berlusconi wanted him at Milan, and during a private meeting to discuss the matter revealed to him that "the FIGC possessed some of [Moggi's] wiretaps without any criminal value, of which Galliani (then-vice-president of Milan and president of Lega Calcio), Carraro (then-president of the FIGC), [and] General Pappa, head of the investigations office of the FIGC, were also aware." Moggi stated that those same wiretaps were made public just a few days after. Moggi had earlier said that Galliani made Calciopoli come out because Berlusconi wanted him at Milan. In regard to the dispute between the FIGC and Juventus, Moggi responded to then-FIGC president Carlo Tavecchio: "From the trials, it turns out that there has been no alteration of the championship, there has been no alteration of the referee grids, even 30 referees were acquitted of the charges. I've helped some of these acquitted referees, I've helped many financially. Poor boys, I felt sorry for them, they didn't know how to pay the lawyer. They were ruined by Calciopoli." About the Supreme Court's sentence, Moggi reiterated his innocence of the criminal association charge, and added: "The Supreme Court speaks of power. But power isn't a crime. I had power because I worked well, it was power because of the quality of the work [as general director] I did." Apart from Milan, Moggi said that he was also sought by Inter Milan. Citing Gianni Agnelli's quote that "the king's groom must have known all the horse thieves", Moggi discussed how "Agnelli said that because during my time it was full of sons of bitches. And he wanted an expert, one who could stand up to these here. For me it's a compliment."

Other proceedings 
In April 2007, the documents relating to the charge against Moggi of kidnapping referee Gianluca Paparesta were sent to the Reggio Calabria prosecutor's office; in the end, the prosecutor filed the case because "the fact does not exist". On 21 January 2009, the preliminary hearing judge (GUP) in Milan acquitted Moggi of the charge of defamation against Inter Milan. Moggi was accused of having defamed Inter Milan as he said that they had saved themselves by negotiating the case of the false passport of Álvaro Recoba without relevant consequences, unlike what happened to Juventus in the Calciopoli case. Gabriele Oriali, at the time an Inter Milan executive, negotiated a sentence of 6 months' imprisonment for receiving stolen goods and forgery. The GUP of Milan considered that Moggi's words were only "expression of the right to criticize, at best imprecise, but not criminally relevant".

On 14 May 2009, the justice of the peace of Lecce acquitted Moggi and referee Massimo De Santis of the charge of sports fraud and match-fixing related to the Lecce–Juventus and Lecce–Fiorentina matches of the 2004–05 Serie A, as sanctioned by the sporting judgements. In particular, the judge established that "the fact described has not been proven in any way" and that "the Judge also does not consider the sentences rendered by the sports justice bodies fully usable since the latter judgment is structurally different from the ordinary judgement. Nor is it believed that the telephone interceptions referred to in the course of the proceedings can have probative value, since they cannot be used in a proceeding other than the one in which they are ordered."

On 24 November 2009, Moggi, along with Giraudo, Roberto Bettega, and Juventus, was acquitted of the charges concerning the management of the club's accounts "because the fact does not exist". Prosecutors had asked for three years in prison for Moggi. On 14 September 2010, Moggi, along with Giraudo, Bettega, Jean-Claude Blanc, and Giovanni Cobolli Gigli, was acquitted of the charge of tax violations on Juventus' financial statements from 2005 to 2008. Turin's judge Eleonora Montserrat Pappalettere accepted the dismissal request presented by the same public prosecutor's office Turin and closed the case opened by an investigation by the Guardia di Finanza. On 11 November 2010, Juventus withdrew the lawsuit against Moggi, Giraudo, and Bettega presented within the same process for the financial statements of the club's old financial management.

On 11 November 2011, the monocratic judge of Rome sentenced Moggi to 4 months' imprisonment and to pay damages of €7,000 to Franco Baldini, who received threats during a trial in which he had to testify. In June 2012, Moggi was sentenced to pay the court costs for the civil lawsuit for defamation brought against Carlo Petrini and Kaos publisher in the light of some sentences in the book Calcio nei coglioni. According to the court of Milan, those sentences are not defamatory but deducible from the report of the Carabinieri also disseminated by the newspapers on the 2005 Offside investigation.

In July 2015, Moggi was acquitted by the Milan court of the charge of defaming former Inter Milan president Giacinto Facchetti in a television broadcast. Moggi had publicly accused Facchetti "of having also requested and obtained special treatment in the refereeing of Inter Milan's matches". The judge dismissed the lawsuit and acquitted Moggi, finding "with certainty a good truthfulness" in his statements and citing the existence of "a sort of lobbying intervention on the part of the-then president of Inter Milan towards the referee class ... , significant of a relationship of a friendly [and] preferential type, [with] heights that are not properly commendable." The sentence was upheld on appeal in 2018, and passed judgment in 2019.

In May 2016, Moggi was sentenced to a €1,000 fine and separate damages for defaming Carabinieri officer Attilio Auricchio, who investigated Calciopoli. The judge made the conditional suspension of the sentence conditional on the payment of a provisional amount of €20,000.

Personal views and politics 
Amid homophobic statements in the Croatian Football Federation, Moggi was quoted as saying in 2010 of gay footballers that "[a] homosexual can't fulfil the job of a footballer. I wouldn't put one under contract and if I discovered I had one, he would fly immediately." In 2013, he declared his intention to run for Italy's Chamber of Deputies as part of Stefania Craxi's Italian Reformists list in Piedmont 1 within the centre-right coalition. Ahead of the 2016 Turin municipal election, he declared his intention to vote for Piero Fassino of the centre-left coalition. He also said that he always voted Sergio Chiamparino for mayor of Turin, and that if he made an electoral list in Turin with Gianluigi Buffon, they would win.

In popular culture 
In 2021, Moggi was featured in an episode of Netflix's documentary series Bad Sport about Calciopoli.

Books

Explanatory notes and quotes

References

Further reading 
 

1937 births
A.S. Roma
Italian sports directors
Juventus F.C. directors
Living people
People from the Province of Siena
People involved in the 2006 Italian football scandal
S.S. Lazio
S.S.C. Napoli
Torino F.C. non-playing staff